Haitang is a town in Ganluo County, Sichuan Province, China. , it administers the following 24 villages:
Haitang Village
Dongmen Village
Zhengxi Village
Xiqiao Village
Daqiao Village
Xujiashan Village
Tangjiawan Village
Pingba Village
Shishi'er Village
Shuangmacao Village
Yaochang Village
Sanpiyan Village
Songshu Village
Baluo Village
Sanshihu Village
Huangshuitang Village
Linzi Village
Lamei Village
Daganyi Village
Lapu Village
Liaoping Village
Xiaohe Village
Ladai Village
Qingshui Village

References

Ganluo County
Towns in Sichuan